Louis Douglas Heck (December 14, 1918 – January 13, 1993) was an American diplomat and State Department official.

Heck was born in Bern, Switzerland, to American parents. After graduating with a B.A. from Yale University in 1941, he joined the State Department's the newly established Division of World Trade Intelligence in 1943. From 1945 to 1952, he was assistant chief and later chief of the Biographic Information Division. In 1952, he became acting director of the Office of Library Information.

He joined the United States Foreign Service in 1952. His first assignment was as a political officer in Calcutta from 1953 to 1959, when he became Deputy Chief of Mission in Nicosia. During his tenure, Cyprus declared independence on August 16, 1960, and the United States recognized the new country that same day. Heck served as chargé d'affaires ad interim of the newly created U.S. Embassy until the appointment of Fraser Wilkins as the first Ambassador to Cyprus eleven days later. He subsequently returned to India, working as counselor of political affairs in New Delhi from 1962 until 1965 and Country Director for India, Ceylon, Nepal, and the Maldives from 1966 to 1968. He was Consul General in Istanbul from 1968 until 1970 and Deputy Chief of Mission in Iran from 1970 to 1974. In 1974, President Richard Nixon appointed him Ambassador to the Republic of Niger. He presented his credentials on May 30, 1974. His service terminated on July 20, 1976, due to his appointment as the first Coordinator for Counterterrorism, a post with the dual rank of Ambassador-at-large and Assistant Secretary. On May 3, 1977, President Jimmy Carter appointed Heck to be Ambassador to Nepal, a role he held until his retirement from the Foreign Service on May 19, 1980.

Heck was married twice, first to Elizabeth, with whom he had two children, then to Ernestine (née Sherman). He received the State Department's Distinguished Service Award in 1974. After his retirement from the State Department, he lived in Madras, India, where he died of Parkinson's disease on January 13, 1993.

References

1918 births
1993 deaths
Ambassadors of the United States to Nepal
Ambassadors of the United States to Niger
People from Cedarville, Ohio
Yale University alumni
20th-century American diplomats
American expatriates in Switzerland
American expatriates in India
American expatriates in Cyprus
American expatriates in Turkey
American expatriates in Iran